Phlegra Dorsa is a region in the Amazonis quadrangle of Mars located at 25.08 N and 170.37 E.  It is 2818.61 km across and was named for classical albedo feature.  The classic feature meant "burning plain; it was a place in Chalcidian Peninsula of Greece where Zeus hurled thunderbolts at Titans to support Hercules.  The name Phlegra Dorsa was approved in 2003.

See also
 Amazonis Planitia

References

Amazonis quadrangle
Albedo features on Mars
Ridges on Mars